Senator Schneider may refer to:

Charles Schneider (politician) (born 1973), Iowa State Senate
Elizabeth Schneider (born 1962), Maine State Senate
John D. Schneider (1937–2017), Missouri State Senate
John R. Schneider (1937–2002), Maryland State Senate
Mac Schneider (born 1979), North Dakota State Senate
Michael A. Schneider (born 1950), Nevada State Senate
Philip Schneider (1826–1902), Wisconsin State Senate
Scott Schneider (fl. 1980s–2010s), Indiana State Senate